Emmanuel Letlotlo (born 15 November 1995) is a South African soccer player who plays as a forward for ABC Motsepe League side Postmasburg FC.

Career
Born in Soweto, Letlotlo signed a three-year contract with ABSA Premiership side Kaizer Chiefs on 31 May 2016 after becoming the top scorer in the reserve league. He made his professional debut for the club on 23 August 2016 in the league against Bidvest Wits. He came on as a 56th-minute substitute in the 56th minute for George Lebese as Kaizer Chiefs lost 2–1.

In summer 2018, he signed for Baroka on loan.

He was released by Kaizer Chiefs in summer 2019.

In December 2020, he signed with Royal AM of the National First Division on a deal until the end of the season.

Career statistics

References

External links 
 Kaizer Chiefs F.C. Profile.

1995 births
Living people
Sportspeople from Soweto
South African soccer players
Kaizer Chiefs F.C. players
Association football forwards